Şehzade Mehmed (1521 – 7 November 1543, Anglicised: Shezade Mehmed) was an Ottoman prince (şehzade), the son of Sultan Suleiman the Magnificent and his wife Hurrem Sultan. He served as governor of Manisa.

Early life
Şehzade Mehmed was born on 1521 in the Old Palace, during Suleiman's campaign to Rhodes. His birth was celebrated in the camp with sacrifices and distribution of alms. His mother was Hurrem Sultan, an Orthodox priest's daughter. In 1533 or 1534, his mother, Hurrem, was freed and became Suleiman's legal wife. He had four younger brothers, Şehzade Abdullah, who died at the age of three years, Şehzade Selim (future Selim II), Şehzade Bayezid, and Şehzade Cihangir, and a younger sister, Mihrimah Sultan. 

Mehmed was circumcised together with his brothers, Şehzade Mustafa and Şehzade Selim on 27 June 1530.

Career
In February 1534, Mustafa was appointed the governor of Manisa. Mehmed on the other hand remained in the capital, and in 1537, joined his father on his campaign to Corfu. In 1541, he and his younger brothers, Şehzade Selim, and Şehzade Bayezid, accompanied their father on his campaign to Buda.

Suleiman favoured Hurrem's son, and appointed Mehmed, his second and most loved son, his heir contrary to the tradition. Soon after their return from Corfu in October 1542, Suleiman under Hurrem's influence, appointed him the governor of Manisa. He also appointed Selim the governor of Karaman. Prior to the appointment, Şehzade Mustafa was sent to Amasya on 16 June 1541. Mehmed began his duties formally as governor soon after his arrival to Manisa on 12 November 1542. 

His mother, however, didn't accompany him to his provincial post. A Manisa register indicates that she did, however, visit Mehmed in 1543. The same year, she also visited her younger son Prince Selim, who had been appointed the governor of Karaman. His only child, Hümaşah Sultan was born in 1543 in Manisa.

Evliya Çelebi describes Mehmed as a "prince of more exquisite qualities than even Mustafa. He had a piercing intellect and a subtle judgment. Suleiman had intended that he would be his successor, but man proposes and God disposes".

Death
Şehzade Mehmed fell ill in Manisa on Wednesday, 31 October 1543. He died shortly after, on Wednesday night, 7 November, probably of smallpox. The following day, Lala Pasha, and Defterdar İbrahim Çelebi took his body to Istanbul. After his death his younger brother Selim replaced him as the governor of Manisa.

After Mehmed's death, Suleiman had the famed imperial architect Mimar Sinan build the Şehzade Mosque in Istanbul to commemorate Mehmed. Also, Suleiman composed an elegy for Mehmed and ended the poem with the line "Most distinguished of the princes, my Sultan Mehmed".

In popular culture
 In the 2003 TV miniseries Hürrem Sultan, Şehzade Mehmed was played by Turkish actor Sezgi Mengi.
 In the 2011–2014 TV series Muhteşem Yüzyıl, (Magnificent Century) Şehzade Mehmed is portrayed by Turkish actor Gürbey İleri (main) in the third season, and Arda Anarat (supporting) in the second and third season.

See also
Ottoman Empire
Ottoman dynasty
Ottoman family tree
Line of succession to the Ottoman throne
List of the mothers of the Ottoman Sultans
List of consorts of the Ottoman Sultans
Ottoman Emperors family tree (simplified)

References

Sources
 
 

1522 births
1543 deaths
16th-century Ottoman royalty
Suleiman the Magnificent
Royalty from Istanbul
Ottoman people of the Ottoman–Venetian Wars